"You're the Only One" is a song written by Carole Bayer Sager and Bruce Roberts, and recorded by American entertainer Dolly Parton.  Included on Parton's album Great Balls of Fire, the song was released as the album's first single in May 1979, topping the U.S. country singles chart.  It was her fifth consecutive chart-topper since 1977.

Chart performance
Weekly

Year-End

References

External links
You're The Only One lyrics at Dolly Parton On-Line

Dolly Parton songs
1979 singles
RPM Country Tracks number-one singles of the year
Songs written by Carole Bayer Sager
Songs written by Bruce Roberts (singer)
RCA Records singles
Song recordings produced by Gary Klein (producer)
1979 songs